Triokinase/FMN cyclase is an enzyme that in humans is encoded by the DAK gene.

Function 

This gene is a member of the family of dihydroxyacetone kinases, which have a protein structure distinct from other kinases. The product of this gene phosphorylates dihydroxyacetone, and also catalyzes the formation of riboflavin 4',5'-phosphate (aka cyclic FMN) from FAD. Several alternatively spliced transcript variants have been identified, but the full-length nature of only one has been determined.

References

Further reading